The Congolese Amateur Swimming Federation, is the national governing body for the sport of swimming in the Republic of the Congo.

References

External links
  

National members of the African Swimming Confederation
Swimming
Swimming in the Republic of the Congo
1970 establishments in the Republic of the Congo
Sports organizations established in 1970